The 2020–21 Seattle Redhawks men's basketball team represented Seattle University during the 2020–21 NCAA Division I men's basketball season. The Redhawks, led by fourth-year head coach Jim Hayford, played their home games at the Redhawk Center as members of the Western Athletic Conference.

Previous season
They finished the season 14–15, 7–7 in WAC play to finish in a tie for fifth place. Due to irregularities in conference standings due to cancelled games, they were set to be the No. 3 seed in the WAC tournament, however, the tournament was cancelled amid the COVID-19 pandemic.

Roster

Schedule and results

|-
!colspan=9 style=| Regular season

|-
!colspan=9 style=| WAC regular season

|-
!colspan=9 style=|WAC tournament

Schedule Source:

References

Seattle Redhawks men's basketball seasons
Seattle Redhawks
Seattle Redhawks
Seattle